Chapman Taylor is a global practice of award-winning architects, masterplanners and interior designers, based in Europe, Asia, and the Middle East.

The practice has completed over 3,000 projects and won over 300 design awards over its history, including the UK Queen's Award.

It specialises in Residential, Retail, Leisure, Hospitality, Transportation and Workplace design, and the combination of these uses into large-scale mixed-use environments.

History
The practice was established in the United Kingdom in 1959 and its first project was the design and delivery of New Scotland Yard which became the headquarters of the London Metropolitan Police. During the 1970s Chapman Taylor was part of the dramatic expansion of the retail sector in the UK.

In the 1980’s the practice was involved in several major London masterplanning schemes, including Millbank Estate, for the Crown Estate Commissioners, a 27-acre Central London site that was planned and built over an 18-year period and the Duke of Westminster’s Grosvenor Estate, a project that has helped ensure the continued growth of London as a major world city.

In the early 1990s, the practice started designing many projects outside the UK and opened its first design studios in mainland Europe. The second decade of the 21st century saw greater international expansion to encompass projects and offices across Europe, Asia, Central and Southern America, and the Middle East.

Founding partner Bob Chapman died in 2017. In 2019, founding partner Jane Durham died.

Major projects
 Eldon Square Shopping Centre, Newcastle, UK (1976) – the first town shopping mall with sloping public spaces (and two 'ground floors')
 Victoria Place, Victoria Station, London, UK (1987) – 80,000 square feet of retail units suspended above the train platforms using the station's existing structure
 MediaCityUK, Manchester, UK (2010)
 Trinity Leeds, Leeds, UK 
 Cabot Circus, Bristol, UK (2008)
 Global Harbor, Shanghai, China (2013)
 Liverpool Waters, Liverpool, UK (2013–)
 Heathrow Terminal 5, (Retail section) London, UK
 Heathrow Terminal 2, (Retail section) London, UK
 Mall of Qatar, Qatar (2016)
 Anchorage Gatway, Salford Quays, Salford, Greater Manchester, UK
 St Pancras International, London, UK 
 Kampus, Manchester, UK 
 Port Baku Tower, Azerbaijan 
 Bob.Dusseldorf, Germany 
 The Flow Building, Prague, Czech Republic

Responsible Design 
Chapman Taylor’s responsible approach extends beyond environmental sustainability; considering the wider socio-economic implications of projects, including the effect on the physical and mental well-being of those who inhabit and use its spaces. There is an available breakdown of sustainable projects and certifications, including BREEAM.

Studios/offices
The company operates from 15 regional design studios across Asia, Europe, and the Middle East, in London, Abu Dhabi, Bangkok, Beijing, Bristol, Brussels, Dubai, Düsseldorf, Hyderabad, Madrid, Manchester, New Delhi, Prague, Shanghai and Warsaw.

References

External links

British companies established in 1959
Architecture firms of the United Kingdom